The Ain River is a river on Graham Island in the Haida Gwaii archipelago of the North Coast region of British Columbia, Canada, flowing southeast into Masset Inlet.

Name
The name was conferred by George Dawson of the Geophysical Survey of Canada in 1878, who derived it from the Haida name Qua'nun.

See also
List of British Columbia rivers

References

Rivers of Haida Gwaii